Dr. Ing. e.h. Bernhard Plettner (December 2, 1914 in Oberlahnstein – November 2, 1997 in Erlangen) was a German engineer and manager. From 1971 to 1981 he was CEO of Siemens AG.

Plettner studied electrical engineering in Darmstadt. After an internship in 1937 he returned to Siemens-Schuckertwerke in Berlin in 1940. After World War II Plettner was especially engaged in restoring the export relations of the firm. Plettner became a member of the board of directors of Siemens-Schuckertwerke in 1959 and CEO of this company in 1962. After the merging of Siemens-Schuckertwerke with Siemens & Halske AG he was a member of the board of directors of  Siemens AG. In 1971 he was appointed CEO. When he was succeeded by Karlheinz Kaske in 1981, Plettner became the first chairman of the supervisory board not to be a member of the Siemens family.  He resigned in 1988.

References
Shaping the Future. The Siemens Entrepreneurs 1847–2018. Ed. Siemens Historical Institute, Hamburg 2018, ..

External links 
Presidents and Chief Executive Officers of Siemens AG

Siemens
1914 births
1997 deaths
People from Erlangen
Knights Commander of the Order of Merit of the Federal Republic of Germany